Berenice Epideires (Greek: , Steph. B. s. v.; Strabo xvi. pp. 769, 773; Mela, iii. 8; Plin. vi. 34; Ptol. viii. 16. § 12), or "Berenice upon the Neck of Land", was a town on the western shore of the Red Sea. It was located near the Bab-el-Mandeb strait, in modern-day Djibouti. The settlement's position on a sandy spit or promontory was the cause of its distinctive appellation. Some authorities, however, attribute the name to the neighborhood of a more considerable town named Cape Deirê on the Ras Siyyan peninsula. Strabon mentions the mangroves that were found there on the coast.

Literature
 Lionel Casson: The Periplus Maris Erythraei: text, translation, and commentary. Princeton University Press, Princeton N.J. 1989, .
 Getzel M. Cohen: The Hellenistic Settlements in Syria, the Red Sea Basin, and North Africa. University of California Press, Berkeley Calif. 2006, .
 George Fadlo Hourani: Arab seafaring in the Indian Ocean. Princeton University Press, Princeton N.J. 1951.
 G. W. B. Huntingford (Hrsg.): The Periplus of the Erythraean Sea, by an unknown author: with some extracts from Agatharkhides ‘On the Erythraean Sea’ (= Works issued by the Hakluyt Society. 2nd series, Nr. 151). Hakluyt Society, London 1980.
 Katja Mueller: Settlements of the Ptolemies: City foundations and new settlement in the Hellenistic World (= Studia Hellenistica. Band 43). Peeters, Leuven 2006, .
 D. Schlingloff: Indische Seefahrer in römischer Zeit. In: Hermann Müller-Karpe (Hrsg.) Zur geschichtlichen Bedeutung der frühen Seefahrt. Beck, München 1982, S. 51–82.

References
 

Port cities in Africa
Roman towns and cities in Djibouti
Ptolemaic colonies in the Red Sea
Former populated places in Djibouti
Ancient Greek geography of East Africa